The 2022 Northwest Territories Scotties Tournament of Hearts, the women's territorial curling championship for the Northwest Territories, was scheduled to be held January 5 to 9 at the Inuvik Curling Club in Inuvik, Northwest Territories. The winning team was to represent Northwest Territories at the 2022 Scotties Tournament of Hearts in Thunder Bay, Ontario.

Following new COVID-19 health orders in the Northwest Territories, the event was cancelled on January 4, 2022. That same day, it was announced that Team Kerry Galusha would represent the Northwest Territories at the 2022 Scotties Tournament of Hearts.

Teams
The teams that registered were as follows:

Round-robin standings

Round-robin results
All draw times are listed in Mountain Time (UTC-07:00).

Draw 1
Wednesday, January 5, 7:30 pm

Draw 2
Thursday, January 6, 2:00 pm

Draw 3
Thursday, January 6, 7:30 pm

Draw 4
Friday, January 7, 2:00 pm

Draw 5
Friday, January 7, 7:30 pm

Draw 6
Saturday, January 8, 2:00 pm

Playoffs

1 vs. 2
Saturday, January 8, 7:30 pm

3 vs. 4
Saturday, January 8, 7:30 pm

Semifinal
Sunday, January 9, 10:00 am

Final
Sunday, January 9, 3:30 pm

References

2022 in the Northwest Territories
Curling in the Northwest Territories
2022 Scotties Tournament of Hearts
January 2022 sports events in Canada
Inuvik
Curling events cancelled due to the COVID-19 pandemic